Zheng Saisai was the defending champion, and successfully defended her title, defeating Han Xinyun in the all-Chinese final, 6–4, 3–6, 6–4.

Seeds

Main draw

Finals

Top half

Bottom half

References 
 Main draw

Anning Open - Singles